

Group A













Group B













References

External links
 FIBA Archive

EuroBasket Women 1997
EuroBasket Women squads